
Gmina Praszka is an urban-rural gmina (administrative district) in Olesno County, Opole Voivodeship, in south-western Poland.

Villages
Apart from the town of Praszka, Gmina Praszka contains the villages and settlements of Aleksandrów, Brzeziny, Gana, Kowale, Kozieł, Kuźniczka, Lachowskie, Marki, Prosna, Przedmość, Rosochy, Rozterk, Skotnica, Sołtysy, Strojec, Szyszków, Tokary, Wierzbie and Wygiełdów.

Neighbouring gminas
Gmina Praszka is bordered by the gminas of Gorzów Śląski, Mokrsko, Pątnów, Radłów, Rudniki and Skomlin.

Twin towns – sister cities

Gmina Praszka is twinned with:
 Bohorodchany, Ukraine
 Mutterstadt, Germany

References

Praszka
Olesno County